was a Japanese actor, voice actor and the former executive director of Dōjinsha Production until its closure. He was a baritone.

Death
On June 28, 2011, Kobayashi died of pancreatic cancer at age 76. His company closed after his death.

Filmography

Live-action
Kousoku Esper (1967) - Narrator
Seiun Kamen Machineman (1984) - Narrator
Kyodai Ken Byclosser (1985) Narrator
Chouriki Sentai Ohranger (1995, Episode: 46) - Bara Guard (voice)
Gekisou Sentai Carranger (1996, Episodes: 37-48) - Reckless Dash Emperor Exhaus, / Exhaus Super-Strong (voice)

Television animation
 Ōgon Bat (1967) (Ōgon Bat)
 Space Battleship Yamato (1974) (Admiral Domel)
 Space Battleship Yamato II (1978) (Emperor Zwordar)
 Space Battleship Yamato III (1980) (Captain Jiro Dan)
 New Tetsujin-28 (1980) (Branch)
 Six God Combination Godmars (1981) (President Gyron)
 Story of the Alps: My Annette (1983) (Pierre)
 Panzer World Galient (1984) (Azbes)
 Space Legend Ulysses 31 (1991 NHK edition) (Ulysses)
 Noir (2001) (Salvatore)

Original video animation (OVA)
Panzer World Galient: Tetsu no Monshō (1986) (Mādaru)
Legend of the Galactic Heroes (1989) (Ottō Braunshweig)
Mars (1994) (Chief Cabinet Secretary)

Theatrical animation
Space Battleship Yamato (1977) - Domel
Hokkyoku no Muushika Miishika (1979) (Muu)
Phoenix 2772 (1980) - Boon
Gamera: Super Monster (1980) - 'Zanon' Captain (voice)
Be Forever Yamato (1980) - Osamu Yamanami
Crusher Joe: The Movie (1983) - Bard 
Final Yamato (1983) - Captain Mizutani 
Silent Möbius 2 (1992) - Combined Apparition
Legend of the Galactic Heroes: Overture to a New War (1993) - Otto Von Braunschweig
Doraemon: Nobita and the Windmasters (2003) - Yaku
Crayon Shin-chan: The Storm Called: The Kasukabe Boys of the Evening Sun (2004) - Chris
Space Battleship Yamato: Resurrection (2009) - Blue Noah Captain

Video games
Kingdom Hearts II (2005) (The Emperor of China)
Toy Story 3: The Video Game (xxxx, Japanese dub) (Prospector)

Dubbing roles

Live-action
Yul Brynner
Anastasia (General Bounine)
The Brothers Karamazov (Dmitri Karamazov)
The Magnificent Seven (Chris Adams)
Taras Bulba (Taras Bulba)
Invitation to a Gunfighter (Jules Gaspard d'Estaing)
Cast a Giant Shadow (Asher)
Return of the Seven (Chris Adams)
Triple Cross (Col. Baron von Grunen)
The Double Man (Dan Slater / Kalmar)
Villa Rides (Pancho Villa)
Battle of Neretva (Vlado)
The File of the Golden Goose (Peter Novak)
Adiós, Sabata (Sabata/Indio Black)
Catlow (Catlow)
Fuzz (The Deaf Man)
Night Flight from Moscow (Vlassov)
Westworld (Gunslinger)
The Ultimate Warrior (Carson)
12 Angry Men (1969 TV Asahi edition) (Juror #1 (Martin Balsam))
Amadeus (1986 TV Asahi edition) (Leopold Mozart (Roy Dotrice))
Big (MacMillan (Robert Loggia))
Chain Reaction (1999 TV Asahi edition) (Dr. Paul Shannon (Morgan Freeman))
Coming to America (1991 Fuji TV edition) (King Jaffe Joffer (James Earl Jones))
The Crazies (1979 Fuji TV edition) (David (W.G. McMillan))
Days of Thunder (Tim Daland (Randy Quaid))
Deliverance (Lewis Medlock (Burt Reynolds))
Die Hard (1990 TV Asahi edition) (Dwayne T. Robinson (Paul Gleason))
The Distinguished Gentleman (Dick Dodge (Lane Smith))
Dracula: Prince of Darkness (Alan Kent (Bud Tingwell))
Dune (Padishah Emperor Shaddam IV (José Ferrer))
El Dorado (Cole Thornton (John Wayne))
First Blood (1999 NTV edition) (Colonel Sam Trautman (Richard Crenna))
The Full Monty (Gerald Arthur Cooper (Tom Wilkinson))
The Glenn Miller Story (1968 TV Asahi edition) (Don Haynes (Charles Drake))
Harry Potter and the Goblet of Fire (Alastor "Mad-Eye" Moody (Brendan Gleeson))
Harry Potter and the Order of the Phoenix (Alastor "Mad-Eye" Moody (Brendan Gleeson))
Harry Potter and the Deathly Hallows – Part 1 (Alastor "Mad-Eye" Moody (Brendan Gleeson))
Hulk (Thaddeus "Thunderbolt" Ross (Sam Elliott))
Iron Will (J.W. Harper (David Ogden Stiers))
Jacob's Ladder (1993 NTV edition) (Louis Denardo (Danny Aiello))
Loaded Weapon 1 (General Curtis Mortars (William Shatner))
The Longest Day (1997 TV Tokyo edition) (Benjamin H. Vandervoort (John Wayne))
The Matrix Reloaded (2006 Fuji TV edition) (Captain Mifune (Nathaniel Lees))
The Matrix Revolutions (2007 Fuji TV edition) (Captain Mifune (Nathaniel Lees))
National Treasure (Patrick Henry Gates (Jon Voight))
National Treasure: Book of Secrets (Patrick Henry Gates (Jon Voight))
Pride and Glory (Francis Tierney, Sr. (Jon Voight))
Rawhide (Gil Favor (Eric Fleming))
Remo Williams: The Adventure Begins (George Grove (Charles Cioffi))
The Rookie (Jim Morris Sr. (Brian Cox))
Scrooged (Preston Rhinelander (Robert Mitchum))
Secondhand Lions (Garth McCann (Michael Caine))
Sherlock Holmes (Sir Thomas Rotheram (James Fox))
Top Gun (1989 Fuji TV edition) (CDR Tom "Stinger" Jordan (James Tolkan))

Animation
Fantastic Four (Mister Fantastic)
Mulan (The Emperor of China)
Mulan II (The Emperor of China)
Toy Story 2 (Stinky Pete the Prospector)
We're Back! A Dinosaur's Story (Rex)

Successors
Katsunosuke Hori — Hyouge Mono: Fujitaka Hosokawa
Ikuya Sawaki — Second Super Robot Taisen Z Reunion: Branch
Akimitsu Takase — Mission: Impossible: Willie Armitage
Minoru Inaba — Under Siege 2: Dark Territory: Admiral Bates (TV Asahi version)
Hideyuki Tanaka — Anpanman: Mr. Cherokee
Jin Urayama — Amadeus: Leopold Mozart
Ryokai Morita — Enter the Dragon: Han (TBS version)
Kenyu Horiuchi — Monkey Business: Dr. Burnaby Fulton (Cary Grant)

References

External links

1934 births
2011 deaths
Deaths from pancreatic cancer
Japanese male video game actors
Japanese male voice actors
Male voice actors from Tokyo